The Emporia State Hornets basketball team represents Emporia State University in Emporia, Kansas, in the NCAA Division II men's basketball competition. The team is coached by Craig Doty, who is in his first season as head coach. The Hornets currently compete in the Mid-America Intercollegiate Athletics Association.

The basketball team plays its home games in William L. White Auditorium downtown Emporia. Since joining the NCAA in 1991, Emporia State has only been to the NCAA Tournament twice: 2004 and 2007.

Overview 
The Emporia State Hornets team annually plays a nineteen-game conference schedule that is preceded by an out-of-conference schedule that includes one exhibition game between the Kansas Jayhawks or the Kansas State Wildcats, switching every other year. The conference schedule consists of playing every MIAA member at least once, some twice. Emporia State does, however, play the Washburn Ichabods in the rivalry known as the Turnpike Tussle and the Pittsburg State Gorillas.

History

Emporia State's basketball program was founded in 1901, thirty-eight years after the university was founded. Since 1901, the Hornets have belonged to six conferences. When the school was a National Association of Intercollegiate Athletics, they participated in the Kansas Collegiate Athletic Conference, Central Intercollegiate Athletic Conference, Rocky Mountain Athletic Conference, Great Plains Athletic Conference, and the Central States Intercollegiate Conference. When the university was recognized as an NCAA Division II school in 1991, they joined the Mid-America Intercollegiate Athletics Association (MIAA).

1901–1918

Earl Carney was the first coach, earning a 10–29 record over six seasons from 1901 to 1907. The inaugural game was a 12–13 loss to the Florence Opera House, a team from Florence, Kansas. ESU would then clinch their first ever victory against the Florence Opera House later that year – 35–21. For the next two seasons, Paul Sampson took over the helm of the program, compiling a 20–8 record. Following Sampson was Fred Honhart for three seasons, who led the Normals (as the school's teams were known until 1921) to a 27–10 record from 1909 to 1912. From 1912 until 1918, Emporia State went through three coaches with a combined record of 58–45: George Crispin (1912–1914), Homer Woodson Hargiss (1914–1916, 1917–1918) and H. D. McChesney from 1916 to 1917. Due to World War I, Emporia State did not have a team from 1918 to 1920.

1920–1943
In 1920, Emporia State resumed sports after World War I ended. A.A. Schabinger, also known as Arthur Schabinger, led the Normals from 1920 to 1922. He had a combined record of 24–9. Homer Woodson Hargiss was the head basketball coach at Emporia State three times—first from 1914 to 1916, then from 1917 to 1918 and then from 1922 to 1923. During his total of four seasons, he garnered a record of 47–19. Vic Trusler was the only other coach at Emporia State to serve more than one time as the head basketball coach at the school. After having Schabinger and Hargiss at the helm, Trusler took the job from 1923–1925 and then again from 1927–1936. After serving as coach for two seasons, Llyod McGahn took the job for only two seasons with a combined record of 22–13. After McGhan left in 1925, Trusler again took the job, remaining in that position until 1936. He departed after leading his teams to 84 wins, 59 losses. From 1936 to 1943, Paul Kutnick lead the Hornets with a 66–60 record. Due to World War II, ESU had no team from 1943 to 1946.

1945–1998
After starting the sports programs back up after World War II, Gus Fish served as head coach from 1946 to 1970 compiling a record of 323–279 record. Fish led the Hornets to six conference championships, tied for another, and made six appearances in the NAIA national tournament, placing fourth in 1946 and 1964. While at ESU, Fish also served as the president of the NAIA in 1955 and helped establish the NAIA track & field program. In 1960, Fish assisted with the U.S. Olympic basketball team as well as became a member of the National Association of Intercollegiate Athletics Hall of Fame. Until 1990, Fish was the all-time winningest coach at Emporia State.

Ron Slaymaker took over the program when Gus Fish retired in 1970. Slaymaker is the winningest coach in Emporia State history, with a record of 452–348. After coaching for 28 years, Slaymaker's teams won a conference title five times and a district championship on four occasions. In 1986, his 31–5 record led him to be named the National Coach of the Year in the NAIA. He earned Coach of the Year for District 10 six times. Slaymaker served as an assistant coach for the U.S. Olympic Festival and the World University Games in the late 1980s. Slaymaker served as a member of the 1988 Olympic Basketball Selection Committee. He also led Emporia State to four NAIA National Tournament appearances.

|- style=""
|colspan="6" style="text-align:center;"|

|- style=""
|colspan="6" style="text-align:center;"|

|- style=""
|colspan="6" style="text-align:center;"|

|- style=""
|colspan="6" style="text-align:center;"|NCAA Independent

|- style=""
|colspan="6" style="text-align:center;"|

Program declines: 1998–2011
After Slaymaker's retirement, Marc Comstock took over the job. After going 33–49 at Emporia State in three years, his contract was not renewed in 2001. Following Comstock was David Moe, son of former NBA player and coach, Doug Moe. In his ten seasons from 2001 to 2011, he led ESU to the NCAA Tournament in 2004 and 2007 and is one of just three coaches to take his team to every MIAA Post Season Tournament held in Kansas City. Those teams advanced to the semifinals of the tournament in four of the last six years. Moe is third most winningest coach in ESU history behind ESU Hall of Honor members Gus Fish and Ron Slaymaker, with a record of 162–126.

Former pro player takes over: 2011–2018
In April 2011, Shaun Vandiver was hired as Emporia State's next coach. Vandiver returned to Wyoming as an assistant coach in April 2018. Vandiver ended with an overall record of 87–111, and a record of 51–90 in the MIAA.

Three-time national champion takes reigns: 2018–present
In April 2018, Craig Doty, a three-time national championship coach, was hired as Emporia State's next coach.

Record vs. MIAA opponents

Venue and culture

Home arena

Since 1940, home basketball games have been played at William L. White Auditorium, a 5,000-seat arena which is named after William Lindsay White, son of William Allen White. The auditorium is also home to the men's basketball team and the Lady Hornets volleyball team since the program started in 1973. In 2008, White Auditorium received an upgrade with a new scoreboard and video board, as well as a new color scheme on the arena floor and the throughout the entire building.

School colors

Emporia State's official school colors are black and gold. They have been the colors since the school was founded in 1863, and until recently, the gold was Old gold.

Mascot

Corky the Hornet is Emporia State University's mascot. In 1923 when the Emporia State was named to the Kansas State Teachers College, the athletic teams were called the "Yaps". Many people, including most Emporia State coach Vic Trusler, did not like the name. Trusler suggested to a writer at the Emporia Gazette that the new name should be the "Yellow Jackets". But due to the lack of newspaper space, the name changed to "Hornets".

In 1933, the Teachers College had a student contest where students and staff could design a mascot for the college. Sophomore Paul Edwards, who graduated in 1937, designed Corky. Although hundreds of drawings were submitted, Edwards' Corky, a "human-like" hornet was selected. Corky was published in The Bulletin, the student newspaper for Emporia State University.

References

External links